Highway 13 is a highway in the Canadian province of Saskatchewan. It runs from the Alberta border (continuing westward as Alberta Highway 501) until it transitions into Highway 2 at the Manitoba border near Antler. Highway 13 is about 676 km (420 mi.) long.
Highway 13 passes through Shaunavon, Assiniboia, Weyburn, Redvers and Carlyle. It is also referred to as the Red Coat Trail, as much of its length follows the route of the original historic path.  A majority of the route between Wauchope and Govenlock going through the Palliser's Triangle is also referred to as the Ghost Town Trail.

Travel route
Travel east through the province of Saskatchewan on the Red Coat Trail is continuous on Highway 13 which is a secondary paved undivided highway until Weyburn. Highway 13 crosses Lodge Creek and Middle Creek, then passes the junction with Highway 21 south followed by Highway 615 north. The highway volume beginning in Saskatchewan along the highway about 45 vehicles per day (vpd) on a class 4 gravel highway.
Highway 615 provides access north to Fort Walsh National Historic Park and the highest point of land in Saskatchewan. Consul is a small village located in the Rural Municipality of Reno No. 51 in the extreme south-west of Saskatchewan, along the highway. It is at the Consul intersection of highways that Highway 13 changes to a thin membrane surface undivided highway where the traffic volume increases to about 80 vpd.  Vidora is located at a small jog in the road following the crossing of Battle Creek.

Travel continues north-east until the junction with Highway 21 which provides access to Cypress Hills Provincial Park and Maple Creek. The highway continues east after this intersection on a class 3 granular pavement highway and traffic here increases to an annual average daily traffic (AADT) of 270 vpd.  At the junction of Highway 18 south is the small hamlet of Robsart, to the east of this intersection, the AADT declines to about 160 vpd. There is a junction with Highway 18 before the highway turns north again to arrive at the intersection of Highway 614 and the town of Eastend, which has the nickname Dino Country where a Tyrannosauraus rex was discovered spawning the T Rex Discovery Centre.  A number of ancient fauna palaeontological dig sites exist in southern Saskatchewan.

This area of Highway 13 receives an increase of traffic wherein about 300 vpd travel Highway 13 east of Eastend and over 650 vpd east of town resulting in an upgrade to asphalt concrete road construction. Highway 13 travels past the intersection with Sk Hwy 633 north  before arriving at the access road to the village of Dollard. The town of Shaunavon is located at the beginning of the concurrency with Sk Hwy 37 and the intersection of secondary highway Sk Hwy 722.

The traffic volume entering Shaunavon is about 600 vpd, and the AADT increases to over 1,000 vpd heading north on the Highway 37 and Highway 13 concurrency. Highway 631 is the next intersection providing access to the hamlet of Scotsguard, and the next junction is with Highway 629 north. There is a short concurrency with Sk Hwy 629, before it leaves the highway in a southerly direction providing access to the small hamlet of Admiral. The village of Cadillac is located at the intersection with Highway 4. Highway 13 is upgraded to a class 5 granular pavement as traffic can reach a high of 530 vpd east of this intersection.

Continuing east along the highway is the intersection with Highway 629 which provides access north to the town of Ponteix. Both the Notukeu Regional Park and Mo are within town, where Mo is a statue of a 70- to 75-million-year-old Plesiosaur (Elasmosaurus) found near Ponteix. Besides palaeontological dig sites, there are also archaeological sites where the pre-historic Napao and Niska Indian sites have been excavated between Cadillac and Ponteix. The Notukeu Heritage Museum Inc. preserves the history of both palaeontological and archaeological artifacts. The Notukeu Wildlife federation has preserved wildlife in the area of the Notukeu Creek and for this purpose has procured land along the Gouverneur Dam and restocks fish and runs a Pheasant farm to re-stock the pheasant population.

After leaving  Ponteix, the next junction is with Highway 612 and west of this intersection is the village of Aneroid home to  Indianola one room sod schoolhouse built in 1911.  Hazenmore is next along the route before the junction with Highway 19 south and the beginning of the  concurrency between Highway 13 and Highway 19. At the village of Kincaid, Highway 19 continues north leaving the concurrency. The hamlet of Meyronne if at the junction with Highway 611 south followed by the hamlet of Woodrow. To the north-west is Thomson Lake which is a man-made lake used for recreational and reservoir purposes becoming the first regional park of Saskatchewan. Lafleche at the junction with Highway 58, and east of this junction the AADT increases to over 600 vpd.  The Louis Pierre Gravel National Historic Marker commemorates history at the north end of Highway 58, and the Cripple Creek Provincial Historic Marker is located at the junction with Highway 13.

The terrain of the Missouri Coteau features low hummocky, undulating, rolling hills, potholes, and grasslands. This physiographic region of Saskatchewan is the uplands Missouri Coteau, a part of the Great Plains Province or Alberta Plateau Region which extends across the south-east corner of the province of Saskatchewan. The village of Limerick is located at the intersection with Highway 358 followed by the junction of Highway 2 and Highway 717 which come together at the town of Assinibioia.

Just to the west of Assiniboia the traffic volume increases to about 1,000 vpd and to the east of town, the volume decreases to about 800 vpd and the majority of the highway is class 3 granular pavement.  Verwood at the north end of the Willow Bunch Lake is located on the concurrency between the highway and Highway 36. The intersection with Highway 624 is followed by the intersection where Highway south and Highway 334 north meet the highway. Ogema is located at the junction with Highway 623 north. Amulet and Pangman are on either side of the intersection of Highway 622. Highway 6 is crossed next followed by the hamlet of Khedive. The junction with Highway 28 south which is next followed by Trossachs. The intersection with Highway 621 north is passed before arriving at the city of Weyburn.  Highway 619 north is before the intersection of Highway 606 where the hamlet of Griffin is located. The hamlet of Froude is next on the highway before the town of Stoughton at the crossroads of Highway 47 and Highway 33. Forget is along the highway, followed by a crossing over Moose Mountain Creek, a tributary of the Souris River then Kisbey]] on Highway 605 and Arcola at the Highway 604 intersection. The town of Carlyle is at the intersection with Highway 9, which provides access north to Moose Mountain Provincial Park and Cannington Manor Provincial Historic Park. Before the Manitoba border are Manor on Highway 603, Antler River, Wauchope on Highway 601, Redvers on Highway 9, Gainsborough Creek and finally Antler on Highway 600.

Red Coat Trail

The Royal Canadian Mounted Police Academy and RCMP Heritage Centre are both located in the capital city of Regina. The Royal Canadian Mounted Police Academy is a training facility for Red Coats or the Royal Canadian Mounted Police officers, while the RCMP Heritage Centre is a museum relates history and memorabilia of the RCMP. Fort Walsh was home to the North-West Mounted Police in the 19th century. Located in south-western Saskatchewan, it oversaw activities in the Big Muddy Badlands north of the Canada–United States border. Sitting Bull, James Walsh, Big Bear, James Macleod, Sam Steele, Dutch Henry, Jones-Nelson gang, Sam Kelly, Chief Sitting Bull, Crazy Horse, John A. Macdonald, and George Armstrong Custer are some names of historic legend in this area.

Major intersections
From west to east:

See also
Roads in Saskatchewan

References

013
Weyburn